L'Yonne républicaine is a regional daily newspaper which is based in Auxerre, Yonne. It started its publication in 1944.

In 2018, its average daily circulation was 25,980 copies with an audience of 105,000 readers. By 2020, the average circulation had dropped to 22,748.

References

External links

1944 establishments in France
Daily newspapers published in France
Publications established in 1944
Yonne